Zevin is a municipality of Azerbaijan.

Zevin can also refer to:

Gabrielle Zevin, American author and screenwriter
Shlomo Yosef Zevin, Russian-Israeli rabbi and editor
Yakov Zevin, Bolshevik activist